Mildera is a village in the Nicobar district of Andaman and Nicobar Islands, India. It is located in the Nancowry tehsil, on the Katchal Island.

Demographics 
According to the 2011 census of India, Mildera had 403 households. The effective literacy rate (i.e. the literacy rate of population excluding children aged 6 and below) was 80.95%.

References 

Villages in Nancowry tehsil